The Forge Village Historic District of Westford, Massachusetts encompasses one of the town's historic 19th century mill villages.  The focal point of the district is the mill complex of the Abbot Worsted Company, around which the village expanded after its founding in 1854.  Prior to its founding the area was the site of a number of blacksmithies and iron forging operations, and was the site of a fulling mill in the 18th century.  The center of the district is at the junction of East and West Prescott Streets with Pleasant Street, radiating away to ballfields on West Prescott, Abbot Street at Pleasant, and just beyond Orchard Street on East Prescott.  Worker housing occupies a number of adjacent streets in the area.

The district was listed on the National Register of Historic Places in 2002.

See also
Brookside Historic District
Graniteville Historic District
National Register of Historic Places listings in Middlesex County, Massachusetts

References

Historic districts in Westford, Massachusetts
National Register of Historic Places in Middlesex County, Massachusetts
Historic districts on the National Register of Historic Places in Massachusetts